Clive County is one of the 141 Cadastral divisions of New South Wales.

The name is of unknown origin.

Parishes 
Clive County consists of the following parishes:

References

Counties of New South Wales